Megophthalminae is a subfamily of leafhoppers; it includes genera included in the former subfamily Agalliinae.

Selected genera 
 Agallia Curtis, 1833
 Agalliana Oman, 1933
 Agallidwipa Viraktamath & Gonçalves, 2013
 Ceratagallia Kirkaldy 1907
 Igerna Kirkaldy, 1903
 Stonasla White, 1878

References 

 
Cicadellidae
Hemiptera subfamilies